Sherry & 11 Others is the debut album by The Four Seasons, released by Vee-Jay Records under catalog number LP-1053 as a monophonic recording in 1962 and later in stereo under catalog number SR-1053 the same year.

Track listing

Personnel
 Frankie Valli – lead vocals
 Nick Massi – bass guitar, vocal arrangements, bass vocals
 Bob Gaudio – keyboards, tenor vocals
 Tommy DeVito – lead guitar, baritone vocals

References

1962 debut albums
The Four Seasons (band) albums
Vee-Jay Records albums
Albums produced by Bob Crewe